Lisiec Wielki is a village in the administrative district of Gmina Stare Miasto, within Konin County, Greater Poland Voivodeship, in west-central Poland.

The village has a population of 400.

References

Lisiec Wielki